Rebecca Jane Lunn  is a Professor and Head of the Centre for Ground Engineering and Energy Geosciences at the University of Strathclyde. I

Lunn studies flow and transport systems in the shallow crust in an effort to characterise uncertainty in nuclear waste disposal,.

Lunn developed techniques to monitor microseismic activity at depths of several kilometres. She has also investigated  self-healing grouts, She researches bacterials and microbial populations in prosthetic liners; research has also considered the development of cheap, safe and comfortable prosthetic limbs.

Lunn leads two Engineering and Physical Sciences Research Council (EPSRC) Nuclear Waste consortia: Biogeochemical Applications in Nuclear Decommissioning and Waste Disposal (BANDD) and Systems Approach For Engineered (SAFE) Barriers. The BANDD consortia includes the investigation of biomineralisation to seal radionuclides and to seal rock fractures. SAFE (a £1.3 M EPSRC programme) developed technology that can monitor thermo-hydro-mechanical-chemical reaction (THMC) variables, including pH, temperature, pressure and swelling.

She is presently involved in a project that aims to reduce the USE of global cement and concrete, through a process called Microbially Induced Calcite Precipitation technique (MICP). Sponsored by the Royal Academy of Engineering and the civil Engineering Contractor, BAM Nuttal, this research has yielded results that can turn soil into a solid state. She has developed most of this research at the University of Strathclyde.

Early life and education 
Lunn studied the Mathematical Tripos at the University of Cambridge. She moved to Newcastle University for her postgraduate studies, earning a master's degree in Science and a PhD in Engineering for research on modelling large drainage basins in 1995.

Career and research

Lunn joined the University of Edinburgh as a lecturer in 1997. She moved to Heriot-Watt University in October 2000. In 2005 Lunn joined the University of Strathclyde. She was made Professor of Civil Engineering  in 2010 and Head of Department in 2011.

In 2013 she participated on the UK Government’s Ad Hoc Advisory Board on Nuclear Research and Development, which gave guidance to the government on this subject matter. She is presently working on geothermal energy production as a member of the Scottish Government Working Group.

She is a member of the Decommissioning, Immobilisation and Storage soluTIons for NuClear wasTe InVEntories (DISTINCTIVE) collaboration.

Over the years, professor Lunn has participated in highly multi-disciplinary research and has collaborated with other scientists such as seismologists, microbiologists, material scientists, and electronic engineers, amongst others.

In 2011 she was the first woman to be made the Head of an Engineering Department in Scotland.

She was the first woman and engineer to win Geological society's the Aberconway Medal in 2011 for her research with the nuclear industry.

In 2015, she was the only engineer or scientist to be named as one of 10 “Outstanding women of Scotland” by Saltire Society, as a recognition for her support of women in science and engineering and research efforts.

Policy and academic service 
In 2009 Lunn was appointed to the Government of the United Kingdom Committee on Radioactive Waste Management. She delivered a public lecture about challenges of disposing of radioactive waste. Lunn served as a member of the Royal Society of Edinburgh inquiry into the future of energy in Scotland. The inquiry looks to assess energy demand in Scotland and investigate how the energy demand may be met. Lunn also serves on the EPSRC engineering Research Council’s Strategic Advisory Team.

Lunn is engaged in activities to improve gender balance in science. The report, Tapping All Out Talents, made a series of recommendations, including ensuring that universities obtained an Athena SWAN Silver Award and encourage shared parental leave. The report was revised in 2018, encouraging behavioural change across the sector. Lunn is Programme Director on the EPSRC (Engineering and Physical Science Research Council) Inclusion Matters project STEM Equals. The proposal looks to build initiatives for LGBT scientists and engineers at the University of Strathclyde.

Awards and honours 
Her awards and honours include:

 2018 Elected a Fellow of the Royal Academy of Engineering (FREng)
 2017 Appointed Member of the British Empire (MBE) in the 2017 Birthday Honours
 2015 Saltire Society Outstanding Women of Scotland
 2014 Elected a Fellow of the Institution of Civil Engineers (FICE)
 2014 Elected a Fellow of the Royal Society of Edinburgh (FRSE) 
 2014 WISE Campaign Leadership Award (shortlisted)
 2011 Awarded the Aberconway Medal by the Geological Society of London

Research and publications 
List of select works by Lunn: 

Bots, Pieter, Renshaw, Joanna C, Payne, Timothy E, Comarmond, M. Josick, Schellenger, Alexandra E. P, Pedrotti, Matteo, Calì, Eleonora, & Lunn, Rebecca J. (2020). Geochemical evidence for the application of nanoparticulate colloidal silica gel for in situ containment of legacy nuclear wastes. Environmental Science. Nano, 7(5), 1481–1495. https://doi.org/10.1039/D0EN00046A

McKay, Lucy, Shipton, Zoe K, Lunn, Rebecca J, Andrews, Billy, Raub, Timothy D, & Boyce, Adrian J. (2019). Detailed internal structure and along-strike variability of the core of a plate boundary fault; the Highland Boundary Fault, Scotland. Journal of the Geological Society, 177(2), 283–296. https://doi.org/10.1144/jgs2018-226

Pedrotti, Matteo, Wong, Christopher, El Mountassir, Gráinne, Renshaw, Joanna C, & Lunn, Rebecca J. (2020). Desiccation behaviour of colloidal silica grouted sand: A new material for the creation of near surface hydraulic barriers. Engineering Geology, 270, 105579. https://doi.org/10.1016/j.enggeo.2020.105579

Romano, Carla R, Zahasky, Christopher, Garing, Charlotte, Minto, James M, Benson, Sally M, Shipton, Zoe K, & Lunn, Rebecca J. (2020). Subcore Scale Fluid Flow Behavior in a Sandstone With Cataclastic Deformation Bands. Water Resources Research, 56(4). https://doi.org/10.1029/2019WR026715

Romano, Carla, Minto, James M, Shipton, Zoe K, & Lunn, Rebecca J. (2019). Automated high accuracy, rapid beam hardening correction in X-Ray Computed Tomography of multi-mineral, heterogeneous core samples. Computers & Geosciences, 131, 144–157. https://doi.org/10.1016/j.cageo.2019.06.009

Stillings, M, Lunn, R. J, Pytharouli, S, Shipton, Z. K, Kinali, M, Lord, R, & Thompson, S. (2021). Microseismic Events Cause Significant pH Drops in Groundwater. Geophysical Research Letters, 48(2).https://doi.org/10.1029/2020GL089885

Yfantis, G, Pytharouli, S, Lunn, R.J, & Carvajal, H.E.M. (2021). Microseismic monitoring illuminates phases of slope failure in soft soils. Engineering Geology, 280, 105940. https://doi.org/10.1016/j.enggeo.2020.105940

References 

Alumni of Newcastle University
Alumni of the University of Cambridge
Academics of the University of Strathclyde
Academics of Heriot-Watt University
Academics of the University of Edinburgh
British geologists
Fellows of the Royal Academy of Engineering
Female Fellows of the Royal Academy of Engineering
Fellows of the Royal Society of Edinburgh
Members of the Order of the British Empire
Women geologists
Year of birth missing (living people)
Living people